Abbeyknockmoy GAA is a Gaelic Athletic Association club located in Abbeyknockmoy, County Galway, Ireland and is almost exclusively concerned with the game of hurling.

History 
The club was founded in 1953. A junior team was affiliated in 1954. In the sane year, the team won its first title and were crowned North Board Junior champions. In the intervening years, the club won a total of 26 titles with senior status attained for the second time in 1985 when they won the Intermediate championship. This was followed in 1988 when they won the first county senior title. In 2011 the club won the county minor B1 championship. In 2015 they defeated Moycullen to land the County Intermediate title on a scoreline of 1-16 to 0-13 and defeated Four Roads in the Connacht Final 1-11 to 0-11.

Honours
1955: 
 North Galway Junior Hurling Championship
 North Galway Intermediate Hurling Championship
1956: 
 North Galway Intermediate Hurling Championship
1957: 
 North Galway Intermediate Hurling League
1959: 
 North Galway Junior Hurling League
1960: 
 North Galway Junior Hurling Championship
1961: 
 North Galway Intermediate Hurling Championship
1962 
 North Galway Intermediate Hurling Championship
1964 
 North Galway Juvenile Hurling Championship
 Galway Juvenile Hurling Championship
1967: 
 North Galway Junior Hurling League
1968: 
 North Galway Junior Hurling Championship
 Galway Junior Hurling Championship
1969: 
 Galway Camogie Championship
1971: 
 Galway Intermediate Hurling Championship Winners
1974: 
 North Galway Minor Hurling Championship
1977: 
 County Junior Hurling Championship
1985: 
 Galway Intermediate Hurling Championship Winners
1986:
 Galway Under 16 Hurling Championship
1988: 
 Galway Senior Hurling Championship
1999: 
 Galway Under 16 Hurling Championship
2001: 
 Junior B Hurling Championship
2011: 
 Galway Under 16 C Hurling Championship
 Galway Minor B1 Hurling Championship
2012: 
 Galway Under 13 Hurling Championship
 Galway Under 12 League Championship
2013: 
 Galway Under 14 Feile Justin Cheevers Cup Champions
 Galway Under 16 C Hurling Championship
2015: 
 Galway Intermediate Hurling Championship Winners
 Connacht Intermediate Club Hurling Championship Winners
2016: 
 All-Ireland Intermediate Club Hurling Championship Finalists

References

External links

Abbeyknockmoy GAA site

Gaelic games clubs in County Galway
Hurling clubs in County Galway